The West China Missionary News (WCMN) was a monthly news magazine published in Chengtu from 1899 to 1945 by the West China Missions Advisory Board, and printed by Canadian Methodist Mission Press. It was aimed at Protestant missionaries working in the Sichuan Province (formerly romanized as Szechwan or Sz-Chuan; also referred to as "West China"), and was the first and longest-running English-language newspaper in that province.

Overview 
The establishment of The West China Missionary News was one of the results of a Protestant Conference held at Chungking in January 1899. The periodical was started as an organ of communication among various missionary workers. As an English newspaper "for the missionaries, about missionaries and written by the missionaries themselves", the positions of editor-in-chief and manager were almost held exclusively by Western missionaries. Although principally aimed at missionaries in West China, the WCMN had subscription services for worldwide readers in Los Angeles. Its highest circulation was around 450. During the Second Sino-Japanese War (1937–1945), the WCMN lost its overseas subscribers and fund donations, it ceased publication by the end of the war.

See also 
 Methodism in Sichuan

References

External links 
 The West China Missionary News Digital Collections: 1908-1940 at Yale University Library

Christian magazines
Christian newspapers
Defunct monthly newspapers
Defunct English-language newspapers
Defunct newspapers published in China
Defunct magazines published in China
News magazines published in Asia
Newspapers established in 1899
Magazines established in 1899
Magazines disestablished in 1945
Mass media in Chengdu
Christianity in Chengdu
Canadian Methodist Mission
Protestantism in Sichuan